Djibouti has participated in nine Summer Olympic Games as of the completion of the 2020 Summer Olympics in Tokyo. They have never competed in the Winter Olympic Games. Djibouti debuted at the 1984 Summer Olympics in Los Angeles, United States of America with three athletes, but did not take home a medal. The highest number of Djiboutian athletes participating in a summer Games is eight in the 1992 games in Barcelona, Spain. Only one Djiboutian athlete has ever won a medal at the Olympics, marathon runner Hussein Ahmed Salah, who won a bronze medal in the 1988 marathon.

Medal tables

Medals by Summer Games

Medals by sport

List of medalists 
Djibouti's one and only medal was a bronze awarded to Hussein Ahmed Salah in the men's marathon at the 1988 Summer Olympics in Seoul, South Korea.

Flagbearers

Training 

Djibouti has a training facility in Ali Sabieh for the male athletics National Team and also has a training facility in Djibouti City. The Djibouti City training facility features a six lane track and hurdles made from PVC pipes. The Ali Sabieh facility has standard hurdles, a high quality track, weights made from cement filled milk cans, and a rarely filled steeplechase water pit.

National Olympic Committee 

Djibouti's National Olympic Committee (NOC) was founded in 1983, and was officially recognized by the International Olympic Committee (IOC) a year later. The NOC is chaired by Ms. Aïcha Garad Ali, who is the coach of the national women's handball team and also a physical education and sports teacher. Ali was first elected May 1, 2005 and re-elected May 1, 2013. The secretary general is Ali Said Houssein, who was the former national football coach and a former teacher.

A vote on January 4, 2017 came out in favor of Aicha Garad for her third term. The next day, 12 of the 22 sports federations filed an appeal to the IOC. The complaint lodged was that an insufficient number of representatives were present at the vote (seven out of 22). They stated in the letter that "...having found numerous irregularities and formal defects in the ballot organized by the outgoing President Mrs. Aicha Garad in the absence of the majority of Federation Presidents, only 7 of 22 were present." Ahmed Salah also filed a complaint for the vote, including that the vote took place without international observers present.

Olympic overview

Pre-Olympics 

Djibouti was a territory until it voted to declare independence from France in 1977, which made 1980 the first Summer Olympics the country would have been eligible for. Djibouti was one of 65 countries that boycotted the 1980 Moscow Olympics in protest of the Soviet war in Afghanistan.

1984 Summer Olympics 

Djibouti debuted at the 1984 Olympic games with three athletes, all competing in the marathon. Djama Robleh finished with the best time, and his eighth-place finish was better than two of the three marathoners who were considered the best at the time.

1988 Summer Olympics 

This was the first year that Djibouti competed in any events in addition to the marathon. Djiboutan Olympians competing in athletics still only ran in long distance events. Ahmed Salah, the only Djiboutian athlete to return from the 1984 Olympic Games, was awarded with Djibouti's one and only medal, a bronze in the marathon, finishing with a time of 2:10:59. In addition to Djibouti's participation in athletics, they made their debut in sailing. Robleh Ali Adou became the first Djiboutan sailor to participate in the Olympics, placing 40th out of 45 participants in the mixed windsurfer category.

1992 Summer Olympics 

As of 2017, the most Olympians Djibouti sent to an Olympics was at the 1992 Olympic Games. These Games also marked the first time Djibouti competed in judo. Both judokas, Youssef Omar Isahak and Alaoui Mohamed Taher failed to win a match. In addition to judo, Djibouti continued its participation in athletics and sailing. Robleh Ali Adou placed 39th in the Lechner A-390. In the athletics events, Djiboutans competed in the 1500 m, 5000 m, 10000 m, and the marathon. The highest place finish in a final was Ahmed Salah, placing 30th in the marathon. Houssein Djama, Moussa Souleiman, and Omar Daher Gadid were all eliminated in the first heat, while Talal Omar Abdillahi did not finish the marathon. Robleh Ali Adou competed in the Lechner A-390 sailing event, finishing in 39th place.

1996 Summer Olympics 

In the 1996 Olympic Games, Djibouti competed in both athletics and sailing. Salah competed in his fourth straight Olympics, finishing highest among Djibouti's marathon competitors with 42nd place. Additionally, two sailors competed in mistral and laser races.

2000 Summer Olympics 

The number of competing athletes for Djibouti was at an all-time low for the 2000 Olympic Games. The first female athlete for Djibouti, Roda Ali Wais, debuted at these games, competing in the 800 m. She set the record for Djibouti's youngest Olympian at an age of 16 years and 62 days. Wais finished last in her heat, 24.15 seconds behind the next competitor. The only other competitor was Omar Daher Gadid, who competed in the marathon and did not finish the race.

2004 Summer Olympics 

Djibouti's NOC entered two athletes into tennis and two into athletics. For reasons currently unknown, none of the competitors participated at the Games.

2008 Summer Olympics 

After an absence in the 2004 Olympics, Djibouti once again sent a small number of athletes in the 2008 Summer Olympics, sending one male and one female athlete to compete at the Games. Neither athlete qualified for the finals. Fathia Ali Bouraleh finished 8th in her heat during the 100 m, and Mahamoud Farah finished 9th in his heat for the 1500 m.

2012 Summer Olympics 

In the 2012 Olympic Games, Djibouti returned in two sports, athletics, judo, and also debuted in swimming and table tennis. Abdourahman Osman and Yasmin Farah did not advance past the first round of their competitions. Sally Raguib, competing in Judo, lost her first match and was eliminated from competition. Zourah Ali became the first female flagbearer for Djibouti in these Games. Mumin Gala, competing in the 5000 m, qualified for the final and placed 13th.

2016 Summer Olympics 

Djibouti had six competitors in athetlics, and one each in judo and swimming. Djibouti was very close to medaling at the 2016 Olympic Games, with Ayanleh Souleiman finishing in fourth for the 1500 m. He also competed in the 800 m, but failed to advance past the semifinals. Anass Houssein lost his first match and was eliminated from competition. Bourhan Abro finished 74th and did not advance past the first round.

References

External links
 
 
 

 
Olympics